The Liuqiu or Lewchew of the Book of Sui and other medieval Chinese texts was a realm said to have existed in the East China Sea. During the 18th and 19th centuries, it was referred to as Liukiu in English; and, Lieou-kieou in French. It is variously identified with Taiwan Island, the Penghu or Pescadore Islands, and the Ryukyu Archipelago.

While this small independent kingdom of seafaring traders was similar to the settlements found in Japan's southern islands, its culture was more strongly influenced by the Chinese.

Book of Sui
A detailed description of an island kingdom called "Liuqiu" may be found in the Book of Sui. The Book of Sui places the report on Liuqiu second to last within the chapter on "Eastern Barbarians" (Dongyi), following the report on Mohe and preceding the report on Wa (Japan). The text describes the territory of Liuqiu and its people as follows:

"The country of Liuqiu is situated amidst islands in the sea, in a location that should be east of Jian'an County, to which one may arrive with five days' travel by water. The land has many caves. Its king's clan name is Huansi, and his given name is Keladou; it is not known how many generations have passed since he and his have come to possess the country. The people of that land call him Kelaoyang, and for his wife, [they] say Duobatu. His place of residence they call Boluotan Grotto, with threefold moats and fences; the perimeter has flowing water, trees and briars as barriers. As for the domicile of the king, it is sixteen rooms large, and engraved with carvings of birds and beasts. There are many Doulou trees, which resemble the orange but with foliage that is dense. The country has four or five chiefs, who unite several villages under their rule; the villages have [their own] little kings."

"The people have deep eyes and long noses, seeming to be rather akin to the Hu, and also having petty cleverness. There is no observance of hierarchy of ruler and minister nor the rite of prostrating oneself with one's palms pressed together. Fathers and children sleep together in the same bed. The men pluck out their whiskers and beards, and any place on their bodies where they happen to have hair, they will also remove it. The adult women use ink to tattoo their hands in the design of insects and serpents. As for marriage, they use wine, delicacies, pearls and shells to arrange a betrothal; if a man and a woman have found pleasure in each other, then they get married."

Identification
There is no scholarly consensus on what specific territory "Liuqiu" refers to in the Book of Sui and History of Yuan. Chang Biyu notes that "Some scholars believe that the record of 'Liuqiu' referred to the Liuqiu Island near Taiwan, while some say it was a reference to what are now the Ryukyu Islands ... and others suggest that it was a general term referring to islands in the East China Sea and nearby waters".

In Japanese-speaking history writing however it is often assumed that the Book of Sui referred directly to what would later become the Ryukyu Kingdom (See Article on History of the Ryukyu Islands).

In his Daoyi Zhilüe (1349), Wang Dayuan clearly used "Liuqiu" as a name for Taiwan or the part of it near to Penghu. In Liuqui Guo Zhilue, it was identified as Ryukyu with specific reference to an island of Gumishan (Kume Island) ruled by a Gumi chief. This text also described this area around 1644 as under strict control of the Japanese shogunate - which is true for the Ryukyu Kingdom (See Invasion of Ryukyu).

Legacy
In later works, the name refers to the Ryukyu Islands in general or Okinawa, the largest of them. After Shō Hashi unified the three kingdoms on Okinawa, the Xuande Emperor gave him the title "King of Liuqiu" in 1428. Indeed, the name of the Ryūkyūs is the simply the Japanese form of Liúqiú. Early modern Chinese sources also specifically called Okinawa (the largest of the Ryukyus) as "Greater Liuqiu" and Taiwan Island as the "Lesser Liuqiu".

The name Liuqiu, in intermittent use since the Ming Dynasty, also remains the official name for Xiaoliuqiu Island southwest of Taiwan. There are sources that refer to Xiaoliuqiu (little Liuqiu) as the old Chinese name for Taiwan.

See also
 Names of Ryukyu

Notes

References

Geographic history of China
Ryukyuan history
History of Taiwan
East China Sea